Könkämäeno is a river in Finland and Sweden in Finnish and Swedish Lapland. It forms the upper course of the Muonionjoki river, which begins where the Könkämäeno river meets the Lätäseno river. The river begins from Lake Kilpisjärvi and forms together with Muonionjoki and the lower course of Torne River the border between Sweden and Finland.

See also
List of rivers in Finland

References

Rivers of Norrbotten County
Torne river basin
Rivers of Enontekiö
Rivers of Finland
Finland–Sweden border
International rivers of Europe
Border rivers